No. 161 (Special Duties) Squadron was a highly secretive unit of the Royal Air Force, performing missions as part of the Royal Air Force Special Duties Service. It was tasked with missions of the Special Operations Executive (SOE) and the Secret Intelligence Service (SIS) during the Second World War. Their primary role was to drop and collect secret agents and equipment into and from Nazi-occupied Europe. The squadron had a secondary role in acting as the King's Flight.

History

The squadron was formed at RAF Newmarket on 15 February 1942 from 138 Squadron’s Lysander flight and a flight of Whitleys and Wellingtons. These were combined with pilots and aircraft from the King’s Flight to create the second SD squadron. The unit was commanded by Edward Fielden, an experienced pilot who had been the CO of the King’s Flight. He inherited two very experienced officers in Guy Lockhart and “Sticky” Murphy from 138. 161's A Flight was made up of six Lysanders, with Guy Lockhart as its commanding officer. A Flight undertook the pick-up operations. The squadron's B Flight flew two-engine Whitleys and Wellingtons, and did agent parachute drops and supply drop missions.

In April 1942 the squadron joined 138 Squadron at RAF Tempsford in Bedfordshire. It remained there for the duration of its service. In November 1942 the B Flight's Whitleys were replaced with the four-engine Halifax.

Following the end of the war in Europe, the squadron was disbanded 2 June 1945.

Aircraft
Several types of aircraft were used by the squadron in the course of their duties.

 Westland Lysander February 1942 - November 1944
 Armstrong Whitworth Whitley V February 1942 - December 1942
 Havoc I February 1942 - December 1943
 Handley Page Halifax B.Mk II September 1942 - December 1942
 Armstrong Whitworth Albemarle October 1942 to April 1943
 Handley Page Halifax B.Mk V November 1942 to November 1944
 Lockheed Hudson III / V October 1943-June 1945
 Short Stirling III and IV September 1943 - June 1945

The Lysanders were used for the landing and collection of agents, while the other types were used for parachuting agents and supplies.

References
Citations

Bibliography

External links

 Squadron history page on official RAF website
 Squadron History on Air of Authority
  Information on the Tempsford Squadrons
   Final flight, and recovery of, Hudson FK790.
This aircraft and the remains of the pilot were discovered 53 years, to the day, after it went missing on an operation.

161 Squadron
Special Operations Executive